Jeffery Kofi Gordor, better known as Nautyca, is a Ghanaian singer-songwriter.

Early life and career 
Nautyca was born on 6 December 1992 in Anloga, Volta Region of Ghana and grew up in Tema. He started as a rapper and later developed into high life singing. His debut single "Social Media" which featured Sarkodie became a hit few days after release.

Discography 
Singles

 Social Media (2019)

 Dane (2020)

Awards and nominations 
Nautyca was crowned the Rising Artist of the Year 2019 at the Youth Excellence Awards (YEA).

References 

Afro pop music
Ghanaian male singer-songwriters
1992 births
Living people